"Forever Love" is a song recorded by American country music artist Reba McEntire from her studio album, If You See Him (1998). It was written by Liz Hengber, Deanna Bryant and Sunny Russ and released on July 15, 1998 as the album's second single. The song reached number four on the US Billboard Hot Country Singles & Tracks chart in November 1998.

It was also the title song to a made-for-television movie Forever Love which aired the same year, starring Reba and Tim Matheson. It is her second single to have a movie named after one of her songs, the first being 1991's "Is There Life Out There".

Critical reception
Deborah Evans Price of Billboard gave the song a mixed review, praising the "sentimental lyric" and "pretty melody" while criticizing the "overly lush pop production". She also criticized McEntire's vocal by saying that it "bounces between being appropriately vulnerable and intimate during the verses to going a little too far on the soaring chorus."

Music Video
The music video for the song was directed by Gerry Wenner, and was filmed to coincide with the movie's release. It is the only solo video released from Reba's If You See Him record. Filmed in Pasadena, CA over one day, it shows footage from the movie, interspersed with scenes of Reba performing the song in a garden.

Chart performance

Year-end charts

References

1998 singles
1998 songs
Reba McEntire songs
Songs written by Liz Hengber
Song recordings produced by David Malloy
MCA Nashville Records singles
Songs written by Sunny Russ
Songs written by Deanna Bryant